Lawton is an unincorporated community located in the towns of Ellsworth and Martell, Pierce County, Wisconsin, United States. The community is most likely named for Lawton Peterson, who ran the store in which the first post office was located when it opened in 1894.

References

Unincorporated communities in Pierce County, Wisconsin
Unincorporated communities in Wisconsin